San Carlos BioPower is a biomass-fired power station under construction in San Carlos, Negros Occidental in the Philippines. It is among the biggest biomass power stations in the Philippines and has a generating capacity of 20 megawatts, enough electricity to provide 212,000 people in the region’s urban centres and rural areas on the island of Negros. The estimated reduction of CO2 is more than 16,000 metric tons per year. The power plant is a cooperation between ThomasLloyd CTI Asia Holdings Pte and Bronzeoak Philippines. General Contractor is Wuxi Huaguang Electric Power Engineering.

The plant will be primary feed with cane trash with some grassy and woody energy crop plants. The feedstock utilisation will bei 170,000 tonnes per year with a local feedstock availability of 1.1 to 1.7 million tonnes per year within a 40 km-radius catchment area. It will operate with a fuel mix of 100,000 tonnes sugarcane trash, 43,000 tonnes grassy biomass, 18,000 tonnes woody biomass and 8,000 tonnes of other biomass. The plant will be connected to an existing 69 kV substation, 1.5 km away when operational. The power plant is expected to create 600 new jobs in the plant and 2,000 jobs in feedstock production and collection.

References

External links
 Business World online: San Carlos Biopower to invest $90M in biomass power plant, issue of November 2, 2014, Retrieved April 1, 2016
 Phil Star: San Carlos BioPower breaks ground for bagasse-fired plant, issue of April 13, 2013, Retrieved April 1, 2016
 Business Inquirer Net: RE firm invests $90M in 20-MW biomass plant, issue of November 3, 2014, Retrieved April 1, 2016
 Project Information on Facebook, Retrieved April 1, 2016
 Youtube-Channel San Carlos BioPower, Retrieved April 1, 2016
 San Carlos BioPower, Retrieved April 1, 2016
 San Carlos City: Jobs at San Carlos BioPower, Retrieved April 1, 2016
 Rappler.com: Green revolution in San Carlos city (video), Retrieved April 1, 2016
 pv magazine: Signalwirkung erwartet, issue of May 15, 2014 (German), Retrieved April 1, 2016

Buildings and structures in San Carlos, Negros Occidental
Biofuel power stations in the Philippines
Renewable energy power plants in the Philippines